Agapius was a Christian martyr killed at Caesarea in AD 306.  He is recognized as a saint by the Catholic Church. His martyrdom is recorded by Eusebius of Caesarea in his work The Martyrs of Palestine.

History 
Agapius was arrested in AD 304. He remained in prison for two years and was tortured on multiple occasions. He was brought out to the arena many times and presented to the judges. There he was threatened and reserved for later matches. The judges, Eusebius notes, must have been motivated either out of compassion or the hope that he might change his mind and renounce Christianity. Finally he was brought to the arena and presented to the emperor Maximinus. He was offered a pardon on the condition that he disavow his faith. According to Eusebius, he not only refused the offer, but he is said to have cheerfully rushed headlong into the bear. The animal inflicted severe injuries, but Agapius survived. Stones were affixed to his feet and he was drowned in the Mediterranean on the following day. 

His feast days are observed on November 20 and August 19.

References

Sources
Eusebius, Martyrs of Palestine 3.1 Eusebius Martyrs of Palestine Chapter 3
Eusebius, Martyrs of Palestine 6.3-8 Eusebius, Martyrs of Palestine Chapter 6
Agapius: The Sacred Heart Saint Encyclopedia
Agapius: Patron Saints Index
Agapius: Catholic Online, Saints & Angels
November 20: St. Patrick Catholic Church, Saint of the Day

306 deaths
Saints from the Holy Land
4th-century Christian martyrs
4th-century Romans
Year of birth unknown